Consumer News and Business Channel Europe (referred to on air simply as CNBC) is a business and financial news television channel which airs across Europe. The station is based in London, where it shares the Adrian Smith-designed 10 Fleet Place building with organisations including Dow Jones & Company. Along with CNBC Asia, the channel is operated by the Singapore-headquartered CNBC subsidiary company CNBC International, which is in turn wholly owned by NBCUniversal.

As the most viewed pan-European financial TV channel according to the 2010 EMS survey, the broadcaster reaches over 100 million households across the continent. CNBC Europe produces four hours of live programming each weekday and airs reports and content for its global sister stations and the outlets of NBC News.

History

1990s

CNBC Europe began broadcasts in March 1996, as a wholly owned subsidiary of NBC. On 9 December 1997, the channel announced that it would merge with the Dow Jones news channel in Europe, European Business News (EBN), which had been on air since 1995. The merger took place in February 1998, upon which the channel then became known officially as "CNBC Europe – A Service of NBC and Dow Jones".

2000s

CNBC Europe has leaned generally on the U.S. CNBC on-air graphical look in the past. However, in June 2003, it revamped a number of its programmes, taking many of them away from the U.S. formats. CNBC Europe re-launched its on-air image in September 2004, but instead of adapting the U.S. title sequences for programmes, designed all of its title sequences itself from scratch (while still using the U.S. music adopted in September 2003).

In July 2005, NBC Universal announced that it would be acquiring the Dow Jones stake in CNBC Europe, subject to required regulatory clearances. On 30 December 2005, CNBC Europe became a wholly owned subsidiary of NBC Universal. Dow Jones continues to provide content to the channel. On 1 January 2006, in line with this, the channel dropped the "A Service of NBC Universal and Dow Jones" tagline.

On 18 September 2006, CNBC Europe debuted a new graphics package, which is similar to that used by its U.S. counterpart (first seen in the United States on 19 December 2005). Like CNBC Asia (which debuted a new graphics package similar to CNBC U.S. and Europe on 30 October 2006), it elected to keep the previous theme music (CNBC Asia did so until March 2007). In addition, CNBC Europe also elected to keep its September 2004 opening titles for most programmes.

The channel adopted a new schedule on 26 March 2007 which included a new pan-regional programme, Capital Connection. New title sequences were given to Power Lunch Europe and Europe Tonight to coincide with changes to the form and content of those programmes, but unlike CNBC Asia, no other changes were made to the channel's on air look on this date (although Capital Connection uses CNBC Asia's new graphics as it is produced by that channel).

On 7 January 2008, the channel unveiled a revamped studio and new "lower thirds". The lower-third style was distinct to CNBC Europe, but adopted some elements of the CNBC U.S. style.

On 29 September 2008 the channel dropped "Europe" from its on-screen name, returning to the CNBC brand it had previously used for a spell in the 1990s. This positioned the station in-line with its U.S. and Asian counterparts, which are also referred to simply as CNBC. Some minor on-screen changes were introduced to coincide with the rebrand.

On 1 December 2008 the channel relaunched its flagship programme Squawk Box Europe, with a new look not derived from CNBC U.S. at all. At the same time a third line was added to the ticker detailing general news stories.

On 15 December 2008 the channel announced that long running show Power Lunch Europe would be removed from the schedule and be replaced, in both Ireland and the United Kingdom only, with a 12-week run of Strictly Money, a new programme focussing specifically on UK issues. This marks the creation of a new UK/Ireland opt-out for CNBC Europe. The new schedule aired from 12 January 2009, with Strictly Money remaining in the schedule until its cancellation in March 2011.

CNBC Europe debuted a new lower thirds, which were completely different from its sister U.S. and Asian channels, on 27 July 2009.

2010s - 2020s

On 22 January 2010, the station ended its encryption on digital satellite television in the UK to increase its viewer footprint to an estimated 11 million households. The channel was subsequently added to Freesat on 23 February 2010.

A significantly revamped studio was unveiled in May 2011 along with a new format for various programmes.

The network was formally merged with CNBC Asia in December 2011 to form a new Singapore-based company, CNBC International, to manage the two stations. As a result of the merger CNBC Asia managing director Satpal Brainch was appointed to lead the new company, with his European counterpart Mick Buckley leaving his post.

On 31 March 2014, CNBC Europe launched in widescreen (16:9) and changed its lower thirds to match the on-air style of its sister CNBC Asia channel, which also launched in widescreen on the same day.  The new look also saw the removal of the on-screen clock, which CNBC Europe had shown during live European and American programming since the channel was launched.  This new on-air style did not carry over to CNBC US, which continued to use the old on-air style.  CNBC US would ultimately follow with its own launch in 16:9 widescreen on 13 October 2014. An on-screen clock returned on this day (13 October) but it was a world clock with the time from various financial capitals shown on a rotating basis.  CNBC Europe's current on-air style (which is based on the US design used since 13 October 2014) was launched 9 March 2015, exactly a month after its sister Asia channel.

On 10 November 2015, CNBC announced cutbacks to its international television operation, including the closure of its Paris and Tokyo bureaus, and a two-hour reduction in local programming from London (which will be filled with more programming from the U.S. feed). The cuts, which will result in the layoff of 15 employees, comes as part of a wider focus on providing European market coverage via digital platforms, such as the CNBC website. The programming cutbacks from London took effect on 4 January 2016.  Only two programmes, Squawk Box Europe and the European version of Street Signs (the latter debuted on the same day), are produced out of CNBC Europe's Fleet Place studios in London.

On 1 February 2019, CNBC Europe launched free-to-air in HD on Astra 28.2°E.
and 19 June 2021, change frequency free-to-air in HD on Astra 28.2°E to 12,168 GHz.

On 12 November 2020, CNBC Europe launched free-to-air in HD on Hot Bird 13°E.

Ratings
Unlike its American sister station, CNBC Europe does not have its ratings measured on a daily basis: the channel resigned its membership of the UK's Broadcasters' Audience Research Board in September 2004 in protest at its refusal to incorporate out-of-home viewing into its audience figures. The network instead focuses its viewership measure strictly towards the top 20% income bracket, where figures are compiled as part of Synovate's European Media and Marketing Survey (EMS). CNBC Europe's monthly viewership grew steadily from 1.7 million to 6.7 million in the decade after its 1998 merger with European Business News, with annual growth coming in at around 10%. In the EMS survey covering 2010, the network's monthly reach was reported to be 6.8 million.

Programming

European Business Day

Current programming
CNBC Europe produces live business day programming from 7h to 11h CET. The major business day programmes, all broadcast from London, on CNBC Europe are:

 Squawk Box Europe – Geoff Cutmore, Steve Sedgwick & Karen Tso
 Street Signs – Joumanna Bercetche and Julianna Tatelbaum
 Decision Time (for live coverage of UK and European Central Bank lender rate announcements) – Joumanna Bercetche

In addition, CNBC Europe produces other business-related programmes. These programmes are premiered at 23h CET and repeated at various times over the weekend. These are:

 Access: Middle East
 The Edge
 Marketing Media Money
 The CNBC Conversation

During the business day, the CNBC Europe Ticker is displayed during both programmes and commercials, providing information on share prices from the leading European stock exchanges (this means that advertisements on CNBC Europe are formatted differently from those on most television channels, taking up only part of the screen). When programming from CNBC Asia is shown, that network's ticker is displayed. A stack (or bug) providing index and commodity prices was displayed in the bottom right hand corner of the screen until December 2005, when it was replaced with a strip across the top of the screen (in line with the other CNBC channels). The ticker was decreased in size at the same time.  The bug was moved back to the bottom right hand corner of the screen on 13 October 2014.

Past programming

Rebroadcasts of CNBC U.S. and CNBC Asia
In addition to its own programming, CNBC Europe also broadcasts live almost all of the business day programming from CNBC U.S.. Worldwide Exchange, Squawk on the Street, TechCheck, Fast Money Half Time Report, Power Lunch and Closing Bell are all broadcast in their entirety. Squawk Box is also now shown in full right across Europe, but prior to March 2011 only the final two hours of the show were available to viewers in the UK and Ireland because CNBC Europe broadcast Strictly Money to UK and Irish viewers. However, on the day when CNBC Europe broadcasts its coverage of the monthly announcements of the UK and European Central Bank lender rates, only the first hour of Squawk Box is shown on CNBC Europe. Squawk Alley was originally not shown because it clashed with European Closing Bell, until the latter show was cancelled on 18 December 2015 (Squawk Alley has since been replaced by TechCheck, which debuted 12 April 2021). Fast Money is occasionally seen live on CNBC Europe, such as during major events as a way of providing the channel with continued live programming. However it is shown between November and March on a four-hour tape delay to fill the one-hour gap between the end of Street Signs and the start of Capital Connection, created by Europe not being on Daylight Saving Time. Mad Money has yet to be seen on CNBC Europe.

While the U.S. markets are open, the CNBC Europe Ticker is modified to carry U.S. share prices. A break filler, consisting of HotBoards (CNBC's custom stock price graphs) is often broadcast during U.S. programming, owing to the increased number of advertising breaks. In addition, for many years, during the evening a recorded Europe Update, a 90-second run down of the European closing prices, and for a time in 2013 this concept was extended into daytime when CNBC Europe broadcast brief European updates twice an hour when the network was broadcasting CNBC U.S.'s Squawk programmes. These segments were broadcast live and, as with the recorded evening updates, were inserted into commercial breaks. Europe Update has now been discontinued and has been replaced with an insert detailing current items on CNBC Europe's website.

The channel also broadcasts live the majority of CNBC Asia's output. However broadcasts of CNBC Asia's live programming had been scaled back in the late 2000s as the channel had broadcast teleshopping and, latterly, poker programming overnight. During the period when poker was shown CNBC Europe only broadcast the final hour (final two hours between April and October) of Asian programming, apart from late Sunday night/early Monday morning when the channel broadcast CNBC Asia's full morning line-up. In 2009, the majority of Asian programming was reinstated although the entire broadcast day of CNBC Asia is still only shown on Sunday night/early Monday morning.

Other programmes
For two hours each weeknight and all weekend the channel does not air live business programming. The weeknight non-business output runs from 10 pm until midnight UK time and consists of an edition of a weekly business magazine show, an edition of Late Night With Seth Meyers and a live broadcast of NBC Nightly News with Lester Holt. At the weekend, programming consists of weekly business magazine programmes such as On The Money and Managing Asia, news and current affairs, sport, several editions of chat show Late Night With Seth Meyers, paid religious programming and special programmes, such as CNBC on Assignment, dedicated to the world of financial news and politics.

The channel also broadcasts four hours of sports programming under the banner of CNBC Sports. The block airs on Saturday and Sunday between 10 am and 2 pm UK time. The middle two hours are devoted to highlights of the US PGA Golf Tour with the rest made up of other highlights and of magazine show Mobil 1 The Grid.

The channel airs some programmes from sister network NBC. These include NBC talk show Late Night With Seth Meyers and NBC Nightly News with Lester Holt. The channel also airs NBC's Sunday morning political talk show Meet The Press, showing it a few hours after its live broadcast.

Paid programming
CNBC Europe carries paid religious programmes. They are shown in a two-hour block on Sundays, between 7am and 9am, with one 30-minute programme broadcast on Saturday mornings.

Previously, the channel had given over much of the overnight hours to teleshopping. Most teleshopping output was broadcast at the weekend although for a time in the mid-2000s, teleshopping was broadcast overnight during the week. Teleshopping ended on CNBC Europe in the early 2010s.

Former programming

CNBC Life
In February 2008 a weekend nine-hour CNBC Life strand, was launched. This slot, which ran during the afternoon and evening, incorporated the already established weekend afternoon sporting coverage of sports such as PGA Tour golf, tennis and yachting with new programming which included travel programmes produced by the Travel Channel, output from The Luxury Channel, news and current affairs broadcasts as well as the airing of programs from sister channels, such as The Tonight Show and Meet the Press. In September 2010 CNBC Europe began airing a series of operas and ballets on Sunday afternoons under the title of CNBC Performance. The 20-part series began in September 2010 and ran until the end of January 2011. This programming was repeated during the rest of 2011.

Since 2012 CNBC Life began to be wound down in favour of a schedule more focused on its core remit of business programming and the lifestyle, travel and CNBC Performance elements started to be removed from the schedule. The CNBC Life branding finally disappeared in 2018.

Simulcasts of MSNBC
The channel used to air American news channel MSNBC during weekend overnights and during the afternoon on American public holidays. CNBC Europe also carried MSNBC during major non-business related breaking news.

By the end of the 2000s, CNBC Europe had stopped showing MSNBC. Standard weekend programming replaced the overnight broadcasts and on American bank holidays CNBC Europe now broadcasts replays of its weekly magazine programmes. Coverage of non-business related breaking news now comes from either CNBC U.S. or NBC News.

Extended programming
In the past CNBC Europe has broadcast extended European programming on U.S. bank holidays. In the mid 2000s, this took the form of an extended edition of Power Lunch Europe, during 2009 and 2010 CNBC had broadcast Strictly Money to the whole of Europe and in 2012 and 2013 the network broadcast a three-hour edition of Worldwide Exchange and a two-hour edition of European Closing Bell. In 2014 and 2015, CNBC Europe did not broadcast any extended programming on U.S. bank holidays, although on many of the 2016 American bank holidays, CNBC Europe broadcast two-hour editions of Street Signs.

Since the start of 2016, CNBC Europe has broadcast almost all of the CNBC US live business day schedule. Previously, the full schedule had only been seen on Europe-wide bank holidays which were regular working days in the United States (CNBC Asia produced Worldwide Exchange on those days) and between Christmas and the new year as CNBC Europe produces less European programming at this time.

On the day each month when the bank lending rates are announced, CNBC Europe broadcasts Decision Time, which airs between 1300 CET and 1500 CET.

The channel provides extra programming during the annual January gathering in Davos of the World Economic Forum. In addition to coverage during its regular programmes, the channel broadcasts a daily one-hour special programme beginning at 1600 CET.

The channel also occasionally opts out of American programming for one-off interviews and/or special coverage of a specific event.

Simulcasts outside Europe
All of CNBC Europe's live programming is broadcast in their entirety in the U.S. on CNBC World and Squawk Box Europe and Street Signs are shown on CNBC Asia.

The CNBC Europe ticker is seen on CNBC World but not on CNBC Asia and CNBC U.S.

Presenters

Current anchors and correspondents

Staff are based in London unless otherwise stated.

Joumanna Bercetche
Geoff Cutmore
Hadley Gamble (Abu Dhabi)
Arjun Kharpal – technology correspondent
Rosanna Lockwood
Steve Sedgwick – also CNBC Europe's OPEC reporter
Julianna Tatelbaum
Karen Tso
Annette Weisbach (Frankfurt) – also CNBC's European Central Bank reporter

Contributors
Tania Bryer

Past anchors and reporters
Becky Anderson (now with CNN International)
Beccy Barr (formerly Rebecca Meehan; later with BBC North West; left television industry in July 2019, now a firefighter)
Louisa Bojesen (left 28 April 2017)
Julia Chatterley (later with Bloomberg Television and now with CNN International)
Ros Childs (now with Australia's ABC News Channel)
Emma Crosby (now with Sky News)
Anna Edwards (now with Bloomberg Europe)
Raymond Frenken (was Amsterdam Market Reporter and EU Correspondent)
Wilfred Frost (later with CNBC US; left 16 February 2022, now with Sky News)
Yousef Gamal El-Din (now with Bloomberg) 
Aaron Heslehurst (now with BBC World News)
Simon Hobbs (later with CNBC US; left in July 2016)
John Holland (was Frankfurt Bureau Chief)
Guy Johnson (now with Bloomberg Europe)
 Shellie Karabell (Paris Bureau Chief 1999-2004; Time Warner Cable , Forbes.com)
Susan Li (moved to CNBC US; left in August 2017, now with Fox Business Network)
Willem Marx (now with NBC News as a London-based correspondent)
Ed Mitchell
Seema Mody (rejoined CNBC US in September 2015)
Stéphane Pedrazzi (now at BFM Business)
Nigel Roberts
Carolin Roth
Patricia Szarvas (now a moderator, media coach, writer)
Silvia Wadhwa
Ross Westgate (now with Infinity Creative Media)

Affiliate channels and partnerships
There is a feed of CNBC Europe for Scandinavian countries called CNBC Nordic. It shows identical programmes to CNBC Europe but has a ticker focussing on Scandinavian stock exchanges.

The channel also operates a separate feed for the United Kingdom. Before late 2008 this was used only occasionally, usually for advertising purposes. The network has since begun to actively market the feed to potential advertisers, and at the start of 2009 its first UK-specific programming, Strictly Money, began, initially as a 12-week experiment but the programme continued to air until March 2011. Now the only UK-specific programming is the occasional weekend teleshopping broadcast. Viewers in Ireland also receive this feed.

The following European channels also fall under the CNBC brand:
CNBC-e, the defunct Turkish version of CNBC. This is unique in the CNBC family, in that after business day hours, it broadcasts popular general entertainment programmes and films, plus children's programming from Nickelodeon. Owned and operated under license by Doğuş Holding. NBCUniversal's share was acquired in 2015 by Discovery Communications and renamed TLC.
Class CNBC (formerly CFN-CNBC), the Italian version of the network, operated in conjunction with Class Editori and Mediaset.
CNBC Arabiya, the Arabic version of the channel. Owned and operated under license by Middle East Business News.
On 10 July 2007, CNBC Europe announced the creation of a new Polish business channel, TVN CNBC Biznes, operated under license by TVN. The channel launched on 3 September, and shares resources with CNBC Europe through a permanent link to their London headquarters.

In December 2003, CNBC Europe signed an agreement with German television news channel N24 to provide regular updates from the Frankfurt Stock Exchange. Correspondents Silvia Wadhwa, Patricia Szarvas and Annette Weisbach report throughout the day in German. In June 2008 the channel also began producing thrice-daily video reports in German for the website of Focus magazine.

Other services
CNBC Europe is narrowcast in London's black cabs on the Cabvision network. Since 2005, CNBC Europe also produces the monthly magazine CNBC Business (formerly named CNBC European Business) in conjunction with Ink Publishing. The magazine is aimed at senior business people and business travellers.

References

External links
 

 
CNBC global channels
Television channels in the Netherlands
Television channels in Flanders
Television channels in Belgium
Television channels in the United Kingdom
Television channels and stations established in 1996